Śródmieście  (meaning "city centre") is one of the five administrative boroughs (dzielnicas) of Wrocław, Poland. Its functions were largely taken over on 8 March 1990 by the Municipal Office of the newly established Wrocław Municipality. The name, though, remained in use, mainly for statistical and administrative purposes.

The Nadodrze, Ołbin, Zacisze, Zalesie, Sępolno, Dąbie, Biskupin and Bartoszowice osiedles are part of Śródmieście. The other boroughs are Fabryczna, Stare Miasto, Krzyki and Psie Pole.

Parks
Śródmieście has a lot of parks with in its boundaries including Park Staszica, Park Słowiański, Park Szczytnicki or the Park of St. Edith Stein.

Landmarks
Śródmieście is home to many landmarks including the Ostrów Tumski where the cathedral is located, the Church of St. Micheal the Archangel with its distinctive black spire, the Centennial Hall and nearby Japanese Garden, as well the famous Wrocław Zoo. The borough is also where the shopping mall Pasaż Grunwaldzki is located. Wrocław's Botanical garden is also located within Śródmieście.

Transport
Śródmieście is bordered by a railway to the north, with the Nadodrze railway station. Within the borough there is a major public transport hub in the Plac Grunwaldzki, located inside of the Ronald Reagan roundabout.

See also
Districts of Wrocław

References

Districts of Wrocław